PS Essex was a passenger vessel built for the Great Eastern Railway in 1896.

History

The ship was built by Earle's Shipbuilding in Hull for the Great Eastern Railway and launched on 8 June 1896.  She was launched by Miss K. Howard, daughter of Captain D. Howard, the Great Eastern Railway Company marine superintendent. She was launched with engines and boilers on board, and steam up.

She was used on local services and coastal excursions.

In 1913 she was sold to Joseph Constant who sold her in 1914 to Henry Cooner, Westcliff. She was acquired by the Goole and Hull Steam Packet Company who held onto her until 1918 when she was sold again to the Hellenic Mediterranean Black Sea Company and renamed Acropolis.

She sailed from Hull on 10 May 1919 for Gibraltar and was reported as foundering on 16 May off Finisterre.  However, this report was later contradicted as she only left Corunna on 22 May 1919.

References

1896 ships
Steamships of the United Kingdom
Paddle steamers of the United Kingdom
Ships built on the Humber
Ships of the Great Eastern Railway